Namsan-dong may refer to:

 Namsan-dong, Busan, a dong in Geumjeong District, Busan
 Namsan-dong, Seoul, a dong in Jung District, Seoul